Judaea Capta coins (also spelled Judea Capta) were a series of commemorative coins originally issued by the Roman Emperor Vespasian to celebrate the capture of Judaea and the destruction of the Second Jewish Temple by his son Titus in 70 CE during the First Jewish Revolt. There are several variants of the coinage. The reverse of the coins may show a female seated right in an attitude of mourning at the base of a palm tree, with either a captive bearded male standing left, with his hands bound behind his back, or the standing figure of the victorious emperor, or the goddess Victoria, with a trophy of weapons, shields, and helmets to the left.

At the bottom of some coins appear the initials SC which stand for "Senatus Consulto",  'by decree of the senate' - the emperor controlled gold and silver coins, and copper alloy coins were controlled by the senate to guarantee their value.

Inscription and imagery
The inscription appears in several versions, IUDAEA CAPTA ("Judaea [has been] conquered"/"conquered Judaea"), in rare cases the harsher IUDAEA DEVICTA or DEVICTA IUDAEA ("Judaea [has been] defeated"/"defeated Judaea"), and also DE IUDAEIS ("[the booty] from the Judaeans") and IUDAEA ("Judaea"). The inscription may also be in Greek, IOYΔAIAΣ EAΛΩKYIAΣ (Ioudaias Healōkyias), a translation of the Latin IUDAEA CAPTA, or it may sometimes be absent, in which case the assessment on whether the coin belongs to the series is made based on the typical imagery used by the mint.

The palm tree can appear on the coin either in combination with the mourning woman, or without her. Andrea Moresino-Zipper contests that in the former case, it is the woman who symbolises the defeated Judaea and the towering, dominating palm stands for victorious Rome, while in the latter case the palm tree does represent Judaea.

History
The Judaea Capta coins were struck for 25 years under Vespasian and his two sons who succeeded him as Emperor - Titus and Domitian. These commemorative coins were issued in bronze, silver and gold by mints in Rome, throughout the Roman Empire, and in Judaea itself. They were issued in every denomination, and at least 48 different types are known.

Only bronze 'Judaea Capta' coins were struck in Caesarea, in the defeated Roman province of Judea. These coins are much cruder than the Roman issues, and the inscriptions are in Greek rather than Latin. The designs feature the goddess Nike writing on a shield, Minerva with a spear, shield, trophy and palm tree, etc. Most such coins were issued during the reign of the Emperor Domitian (81-96 AD).

Unusually, a 'Judaea Capta' coin was also minted by the Jewish ruler Agrippa II, the great-grandson of Herod the Great. Brought up in Rome at the court of Claudius, Agrippa was thoroughly Romanised and was a close friend of Titus, whom he supported throughout the First Jewish Revolt. His bronze coin was minted at Tiberias and shows a portrait of Titus on the obverse with the Greek inscription 'ΚΑΙΣΑΡ ΣΕΒΑΣ ΑΥΤΟΚΡ ΤΙΤΟΣ' (abbreviated for Καῖσαρ Σεβαστὸς Αυτοκράτωρ Τίτος, in Latin: "Caesar Augustus Imperator Titus"), while the reverse depicted  the goddess Nike advancing right holding a wreath and palm branch over her shoulder, with a star in upper right field and the inscription 'ETO - KS BA  AGRI-PPA'.

See also

Arch of Titus
First Jewish Revolt coinage
First Jewish–Roman War
Jewish–Roman wars
List of historical currencies
Fall of Masada
Second Temple
Siege of Jerusalem
Temple in Jerusalem

References

External links
Titus coinage, including Judaea Capta coins
List of all the Judaea Capta coins with pictures and descriptions
Vespasian  coinage, including Judaea Capta coins
Domitian coinage, including Judaea Capta coins
Judaea Capta coins on The Handbook of Biblical Numismatics
'Judaea Capta' coins on Jewish History.com
Gold 'Judaea Capta' coin
'Judaea Capta' coinage on The Abraham Cowley Text and Image Archive
'Judaea Capta' coinage
"Roman Coins Boast 'Judaea Capta'" Biblical Archaeology Society
Coinage of the Flavian Dynasty Gallery featuring many 'Judaea Capta' coins

1st-century works
Jews and Judaism in the Roman Empire
Coins of ancient Rome
Historical currencies, List of
Commemorative coins
Siege of Jerusalem (70 CE)
Vespasian